Parisian Life (French:La Vie parisienne) is a 1936 French musical film directed by Robert Siodmak and starring Max Dearly, Conchita Montenegro and George Rigaud.

The film was made by Nero Film, run by the émigré producer Seymour Nebenzal. It is based on the opera La Vie parisienne. The film's sets were designed by Jacques Colombier. A separate English-language version, called Parisian Life, was also produced. The production was not a success, causing financial problems for the company.

Cast
 Max Dearly as Ramiro Mendoza  
 Conchita Montenegro as Helenita  
 George Rigaud as Jacques Mendoza  
 Christian-Gérard as Georges  
 Germaine Aussey as Simone  
 Marcelle Praince as Liane d'Ysigny 
 Bergeol 
 Valentine Camax 
 Roger Dann 
 Maurice Devienne 
 Gaston Dupray 
 Enrico Glori 
 Jacques Henley 
 Richard Lamy 
 Georges Morton 
 Jean Périer 
 Claude Roussell 
 Germaine Sablon 
 Sinoël
 Michèle Morgan as Extra  
 Austin Trevor as Don Joâo

References

Bibliography 
 Bock, Hans-Michael & Bergfelder, Tim. The Concise CineGraph. Encyclopedia of German Cinema. Berghahn Books, 2009.

External links 

1936 films
French musical films
1936 musical films
1930s French-language films
Films directed by Robert Siodmak
Films set in Paris
French multilingual films
Films based on operettas
French black-and-white films
1936 multilingual films
1930s French films